Diuris parvipetala, commonly known as slender purple donkey orchid, is a species of orchid that is endemic to eastern Australia. It usually has two leaves at its base and up to nine relatively small, whitish to mauve flowers with purple markings. It is an uncommon species found in northern New South Wales and southern Queensland.

Description
Flowering occurs from August to October.

Taxonomy and naming
The slender purple donkey orchid was first formally described in 1964 by Alick Dockrill who gave it the name Diuris punctata var. parvipetala. The description was published in The Victorian Naturalist from a specimen collected near Brigooda. In 1987 David Jones and Mark Clements raised it to species status as Diuris parvipetalum. The specific epithet (parvipetala) is derived from the Latin words parvus meaning "small" and petalum meaning "leaf".

Distribution and habitat
Diuris parvipetala grows with grasses and between rocks from about Mount Moffatt in Queensland to Emmaville in New South Wales.

Conservation
Diuris ochroma is classed as "vulnerable" under the Queensland Government Nature Conservation Act 1992.

References

parvipetala
Endemic orchids of Australia
Orchids of New South Wales
Orchids of Queensland
Plants described in 1964